Mildred Allen (March 25, 1894 – November 4, 1990) was an American physicist.

Biography

Early life and education
Mildred Allen was born in Sharon, Massachusetts to MIT professor C. Frank Allen and Caroline Hadley Allen. She had one younger sister, Margaret Allen Anderson.

Allen graduated from Vassar College in 1916 with Phi Beta Kappa honors. She completed her doctoral studies in physics in 1922 at Clark University with Arthur Gordon Webster, with thesis research done at Massachusetts Institute of Technology.

Career
During the 1920s and early 1930s, Allen taught at Mount Holyoke, Wellesley and Oberlin Colleges and undertook post-doctoral work at the University of Chicago and at Yale University. She began working with William Francis Gray Swann at Yale and continued work under his direction with the Bartol Research Foundation between 1927 and 1930. She also did research at Harvard University before becoming a professor at Mount Holyoke, where she taught for 31 years, until her retirement in 1959.

For nearly 20 years, starting in the early 1960s, Allen collaborated with Erwin Saxl, an industrial physicist living in Harvard, Massachusetts, on experiments with a torsion pendulum. Allen and Saxl reported anomalous changes in the period of a torsion pendulum during a solar eclipse in 1970 and hypothesized that “gravitational theory needs to be modified”.  Their measurements, and similar anomalies earlier observed by Allais using a paraconical pendulum, have not been accepted by the physics community as in need of unconventional explanation, and subsequent experiments have not succeeded in reproducing the results.

References

External links
 
 Mildred Allen papers at Mount Holyoke College
 Mildred Allen photo  dated 1959, Mount Holyoke Digital Collections Online
 .

1894 births
1990 deaths
Clark University alumni
Wellesley College faculty
Oberlin College faculty
Yale University alumni
University of Chicago alumni
Massachusetts Institute of Technology people
Mount Holyoke College faculty
Vassar College alumni
Harvard University people
American women physicists
People from Sharon, Massachusetts
20th-century American women scientists
20th-century American physicists
Fellows of the American Physical Society
American women academics